The Mrs. Revere Stakes is a Grade III American Thoroughbred horse race for three-year-old fillies run over a distance of  miles on turf held annually in November at Churchill Downs in Louisville, Kentucky during the fall meeting. Currently offers a purse of $200,000.

History

The Mrs. Revere Stakes is named in honor of the filly, Mrs. Revere born in 1981. Mrs. Revere won four Churchill Downs stakes during 1984-85 including the Regret Stakes, Edgewood Stakes and Dogwood Stakes as a three-year-old and the Kentucky Cardinal Handicap as a four-year-old.

The event was inaugurated on 16 November 1991 at was won by the 4/5 odds-on William S. Farish III & Edward J. Hudson Jr. owned filly Spanish Parade who was ridden by US Hall of Fame jockey Pat Day with a last to first sweep in a time of 1:46.19.

The American Graded Stakes Committee classified the event as Grade III in 1995 and three years later, in 1998 was upgraded to Grade II.

Records
Speed record:
 miles:  1:41.73  – Mary's Follies  (2009)

Margins:
7 lengths – Weekend Madness (IRE) (1993)

Most wins by a jockey:
 4 – Julien R. Leparoux (2008, 2011, 2012, 2014)

Most wins by a trainer:
 2 – Neil J. Howard (1991, 1997)
 2 – Thomas J. Skiffington (1994, 1996)
 2 – Todd A. Pletcher (2004, 2015)

Most wins by an owner:
 2 – William S. Farish III & Edward J. Hudson Jr. (1991, 1997)
 2 – Kenneth and Sarah Ramsey (2006, 2013)

Winners

Legend:

See also
 List of American and Canadian Graded races

External site
 Churchill Downs Media Guide - $300,000 Mrs. Revere (Grade II)

References

1991 establishments in Kentucky
Horse races in Kentucky
Churchill Downs horse races
Flat horse races for three-year-old fillies
Graded stakes races in the United States
Recurring sporting events established in 1991
Turf races in the United States
Grade 3 stakes races in the United States